The 1987–88 UCLA Bruins men's basketball team represented the University of California, Los Angeles in the 1987–88 NCAA Division I men's basketball season. UCLA hosted the #12 Temple Owls and the #4 North Carolina Tarheels. UCLA lost their home game to the #3 Wildcats 76–78 in overtime. The Bruins finished tied for second place in the Pac-10 behind Arizona. In the Pac-10 tournament UCLA was upset in their first game vs. Washington St. The Bruins did not play in any post season tournaments after that for the first time in four years. Walt Hazzard who had played for UCLA under John Wooden, coached for his fourth and final year at UCLA (the longest tenure at this point of any post-Wooden coach).

Starting lineup

Roster

Schedule

|-
!colspan=9 style=|Regular Season

|-
!colspan=9 style=| Pac-10 Tournament

Source

Notes
 Oregon St. swept the Bruins for the first time in four years (1983–84), and for only the third time since 1958.

References

UCLA Bruins men's basketball seasons
Ucla
UCLA Bruins men's basketball team
UCLA Bruins men's basketball team